Eulyes is a genus of true assassin bugs belonging to the family Reduviidae.

Species
 Eulyes amoena (Guérin, 1838) 
 Eulyes bellula Miller, 1948 
 Eulyes illustris Stål, 1863 
 Eulyes melanoptera Dohrn, 1859 
 Eulyes preciosa Dohrn, 1859 
 Eulyes regalis Miller, 1953 
 Eulyes sanguinolentus Distant, 1903 
 Eulyes superba Breddin, 1901

References

 Maldonado Capriles J. (1990): Catalogue of the Reduviidae of the World, Caribbean Journal of Science, University of Puerto Rico

Reduviidae
Cimicomorpha genera